The beaver drop was a 1948 Idaho Department of Fish and Game program to relocate beavers (Castor canadensis). The program involved moving 76 beavers by airplane and parachuting them to new areas in Central Idaho.The program was initiated to both reduce cost and decrease mortality rates during the relocation.  Alleviating complaints about "nuisance beavers" and their activities were an underlying reason for it.

Background
People had been moving from cities to areas with beavers. The Idaho Department of Fish and Game decided to move 76 beavers because the new residents complained about beavers cutting down trees and creating dams. The Fish and Game Department understood that beavers helped wetlands, helped to reduce erosion, and created habitat for birds and fish, so the Department wanted to move the beavers to other areas of the state. An April 17, 1939, Time magazine article recognized the important work that beavers had been doing in Idaho since the United States Department of the Interior began relocating beavers to the state in 1936.

Transporting the beavers by land was difficult and costly and also resulted in the death of some beavers. The previous transportation method for moving beavers entailed trapping beavers and then delivering them to a conservation officer. Next the beavers would be loaded onto a truck, and transported to the areas of relocation. Beavers were then boxed and strapped onto a horse or mule to be carried over land. This resulted in beavers overheating and becoming stressed.

Parachuting
The goal was to move beavers from the McCall and Payette Lake areas of Idaho to the Chamberlain Basin in central Idaho. One Idaho Department of Fish and Game employee named Elmo W. Heter came up with an idea to use leftover WWII parachutes and lidless wooden boxes to fly the beavers to the area. Two boxes with breathing holes were fitted together like a suitcase and hinged. Heavy  elastic bands were fastened to the bottom of the box and extended  up the sides of the box; they formed double springs which would snap open the box upon landing. Ropes held the boxes together until the box landed and the box automatically opened. The design was tested with a beaver nicknamed Geronimo. Two beavers were put in each  x  x  box.

Conservation officers consulted with the Idaho State Fur Supervisor and carefully selected sites to receive beavers. From their previous experience they learned that younger beavers were easier to relocate successfully. They found it was best to relocate groups of four beavers: one male and three females.

On August 14, 1948, a twin-engine Beechcraft took off with eight crates of beavers, a pilot and a conservation officer. In the following days 76 beavers were parachuted into meadows. One beaver forced its way out of the top of the box while parachuting; the beaver then jumped to its death and became the only casualty of the operation.

Legacy
The beaver drop was likely confusing and stressful for beavers. It is remembered as both ingenious and bizarre. In 1949 the operation was deemed successful after officials observed the beavers had made homes in the new areas. Also in 1949, Popular Mechanics magazine published an article about the parachuting beavers, calling the beavers "Parabeavers".

In 2015 a fish and game historian discovered the film of the beaver drops and the Idaho State Historical Society uploaded the video to YouTube. Time magazine claimed that the uploaded video made beavers, "the Internet's latest favorite animal".

In 2015 the Idaho state fur bearer manager for Fish and Game, Steve Nadeau said the state still traps and relocates beavers. He said it has been fifty years since the state relocated beavers by air.

See also
Beaver eradication in Tierra del Fuego
Operation Cat Drop

References

External links

Parachuting
1948 in Idaho
Beavers
Beavers
Rodents and humans
August 1948 events in the United States